Édgar Jahir Alaffita García (born 18 October 1996) is a Mexican professional footballer who plays as a defender for Liga MX club UNAM.

Club career
Alaffita was discovered by Miguel Fuentes, who was San Luis's coach at the time, while playing for San Luis in various youth competitions. He signed his first professional contract in June 2013 and made his first team league debut on August 30, 2013, coming on as a 66' substitute for Néstor Olguín in a 2–1 win against Estudiantes Tecos.

Alaffita was loaned out to Club Necaxa in June 2014.

Honours
Necaxa
Ascenso MX: 2014 Apertura

References

External links
 
 
Édgar Alaffita at Club Necaxa profile

1996 births
Living people
Association football defenders
Mexican footballers
Atlético San Luis footballers
Club Necaxa footballers
Lobos BUAP footballers
Cimarrones de Sonora players
Alebrijes de Oaxaca players
Ascenso MX players
Liga de Expansión MX players
Liga Premier de México players
Tercera División de México players
Footballers from Veracruz
People from Poza Rica